Maximilian Neuchrist (born 22 July 1991) is an Austrian tennis player playing on the ATP Challenger Tour who competes on the ATP Challenger and ITF Futures tour level.

Neuchrist has a career high ATP singles ranking of world No. 244 achieved on 30 July 2018. He also has a career high ATP doubles ranking of world No. 135 achieved on 3 March 2014.

Neuchrist has reached 27 career singles finals with a record of 13 wins and 14 losses, one at the ATP Challenger and the rest at the ITF Futures level. Additionally, he has reached 60 career doubles finals posting a record of 37 wins and 23 losses, which includes a 2–3 record in ATP Challenger finals.

Neuchrist made his ATP Tour debut at the 2012 Vienna Open where he was granted a wild card entry into the main doubles draw alongside compatriot Andreas Haider-Maurer. They were defeated in the first round in three sets by Aljaž Bedene and Grega Žemlja 7–6(7–5), 3–6, [8–10].

He reached his maiden final at the 2022 Maia Challenger where he lost to Luca Van Assche.

ATP Challenger and ITF Futures finals

Singles: 27 (13–14)

Doubles: 60 (37–23)

References

External links
 
 

1991 births
Living people
Austrian male tennis players
21st-century Austrian people